Kirkintilloch Rob Roy Football Club are a Scottish football club based in the town of Kirkintilloch, East Dunbartonshire. Nicknamed The Rabs or The Roy, they were formed in 1878.

History
They are named after a defunct curling club which bore the same name, formed in 1855.

The well-known footballer Chic Charnley had a spell playing for The Rabs as did ex-Rangers defender Marvin Andrews. The Rabs have had many famous names playing for them – Joe McBride, Stevie Chalmers, George Young, Andy Lynch and Andy Ritchie.

The Rabs also featured in the very first televised Scottish Junior Cup Final on STV when they played Kilbirnie Ladeside in the 1977 final at Hampden Park, Glasgow, in front of a crowd of 11,476.

On 15 May 1963, Chelsea (who had just gained promotion to the top tier of the Football League) came to Adamslie Park to play Rob Roy in what was billed as a "Freedom from Hunger" charity match. Chelsea won 3–2 with their goals coming from Mulholland (two goals) and Peter Houseman. Cooper and Reid (penalty) had pulled Rob Roy back to 2–2 before Houseman's winner.

After season 2007–08, Rob Roy were promoted to the Super Premier Division of the West Region. In season 2008–09 they finished a respectable sixth in the top division and also reached, for the first time in nearly 30 years, the semi-finals of the Scottish Junior Cup; they narrowly lost 1–0 on aggregate to the subsequent winners, Auchinleck Talbot. 
Season 2016–17 was Rob Roy's eighth season in the Super Premier Division of the West Region, a season where the club achieved a record high finish of 2nd and a record high points total of 43 as well as adding the Central League Cup to the trophy cabinet.

Stadium
The team currently play their home games at Guy's Meadow, home of Cumbernauld United, whilst they wait for a new home ground to be built in Kirkintilloch. They previously played at Adamslie Park from 1926 until 2014. The opening game was against Petershill in which saw Petershill win the first match at Adamslie Park. Previously they had played at Smillies Pond (Coxdale Park) in the 1878/79 season, followed by a spell at a ground in the Broadcroft area of the town (where the Lion Foundry would be built) until 1889. The club then moved to Kelvindale Park, situated beside the River Kelvin which would remain their home until 1926. The decision to move once again from Kelvindale Park was due to the ground being no longer viable for the clubs needs.

After several years of unsuccessful attempts to sell the ground to keep Kirkintilloch Rob Roy financially viable (the club's social club having closed with debts of around £30,000), it was announced in April 2014 that the last match to be played at Adamslie Park would be a friendly against Rangers on Sunday 18 May, the ground having been sold to a house builder for £1.8 million. The last competitive match to be played at Adamslie Park was a league relegation playoff match on Tuesday 3 June 2014 against Shotts. The match ended in a 1–1 draw, with the Rabs eventually being relegated.

The club also announced that, during the 2014–15 season, they would groundshare with Cumbernauld United at Guy's Meadow before moving to a new stadium in the Southbank area of Kirkintilloch. The new stadium will have modern stand with a capacity for 500 spectators as well as other modern facilities including FIFA’s approved 4G pitch.

Management team

Honours

Scottish Junior Cup
Winners: 1920–21, 1942–43, 1961–62
Runners-up: 1905–06, 1931–32, 1936–37, 1968–69, 1976–77
Semi Finalists on 11 Occasions

West Of Scotland Cup
Winners: 1960–61, 1962–63

Central League Champions
 Winners:1961–62, 1962–63

SJFA West Super League First Division
 Winners: 2007–08

SJFA West Central Division One
 Winners: 2006–07

Central Sectional League Cup
Winners : 1971–72, 1973–74 , 2016–17

Central Cup 
Winners : 1923–24, 1927–28, 1931–32

Other Trophies
Glasgow Dryburgh Cup: 1923–24, 1927–28, 1931–32
Jubilee Cup Winners 1977
Coronation Cup Winners 1954–55, 1957–58, 1960–61
Evening Times Trophy 1961–62, 1962–63, 1963–64

Former players

1. Players that have played/managed in the Scottish Football League or any foreign equivalent to this level (i.e. fully professional league).
2. Players with full international caps.
3. Players that hold a club record.
 Marvin Andrews
 Phil Cannie
 Stevie Chalmers
 Chic Charnley
 Adam Coakley
 Joe Fascione
 Kevin Finlayson
 Dean Keenan
 Joe McBride
 Danny O'Donnell
 Andy Ritchie
 George Young
 Sammy Black

References

External links 
 
 Article about closure of Adamslie Park, Evening Times

 
Association football clubs established in 1878
Football clubs in Scotland
Scottish Junior Football Association clubs
Football in East Dunbartonshire
Kirkintilloch
1878 establishments in Scotland
West of Scotland Football League teams